Soilhyo Mété (born 5 January 1988), also commonly spelled Soilyho Mété, is a French former professional footballer who played as a defender.

Career
An FC Nantes youth product, Mété made one appearance in Ligue 1 for the club.

After being released by Nantes, Mété joined Championnat de France Amateur club Red Star where he established himself in the club's defence and became the team's captain, helping his side concede just 11 goals in 15 matches.

In June 2012 Mété moved to Racing Colombes 92 of the Championnat de France Amateur 2.

References

External links
 
 

1988 births
Living people
People from Soisy-sous-Montmorency
French sportspeople of Ivorian descent
French footballers
Footballers from Val-d'Oise
Association football defenders
Ligue 1 players
Championnat National 2 players
Championnat National 3 players
FC Nantes players
Red Star F.C. players
Racing Club de France Football players
FC Chambly Oise players